Phelps Franklin Darby (October 17, 1881 – April 23, 1957) was a player and coach of Indiana Hoosiers men's basketball team in 1902.

Indiana player–coach 

Phelps Darby, a law student and starting center on Indiana's first basketball team, returned in 1901–02 as the captain, a role that, with no designated coach, made him a virtual player-coach. Darby, who also starred in football, was in charge of the 12-man varsity basketball squad. The rest of about 50 candidates for the team formed a class taught by athletic director and football coach James H. Horne. The class was necessary to widen the base of athletes familiar with the 10-year-old sport.

Basketball's newness had other ramifications, too. According to the Arbutus, "The fact that the game has been so recently adopted as a college game, and there were so few experienced players in the university, prevented a general interest on the part of the student body."

Darby's team went 4-4 against collegiate opposition, all from within the state. Purdue University games were disasters for the Hoosiers: 32–8 in Bloomington, 71–25 at Purdue. For more than 40 years, the loss to Purdue was the highest score ever against the Hoosiers, until George Mikan and DePaul beat Indiana 81–43 on December 18, 1943.

Indiana Athletes Association 

Phelps Darby was a leader in the Western Conference (also known as the "Big Nine"), which would later become the Big Ten Conference. In its second year, a decision was made to change control of athletics at Indiana from a faculty committee to what was called "a more general body, in which faculty, students and alumni would be represented." "To further this end the Athletes Association was organized and assumed complete control of all athletics, and it was stipulated that no man, unless a member of the association, could represent Indiana in any athletic event. Over 250 shares were immediately sold." Darby served as the association's first president.

Later life 

A few years after graduation, Darby returned to join Indiana's law school faculty as a specialist in bankruptcy laws. Darby practiced law in Evansville, Indiana for 53 years, and he served in the Indiana legislature. He died in Evansville on April 23, 1957.

Head coaching record

Source:

References

1881 births
1957 deaths
American men's basketball players
Basketball coaches from Indiana
Basketball players from Indiana
Indiana Hoosiers football players
Indiana Hoosiers men's basketball coaches
Indiana Hoosiers men's basketball players
Indiana lawyers
Sportspeople from Evansville, Indiana
20th-century American lawyers